The Ectothiorhodospiraceae are a family of purple sulfur bacteria, distinguished by producing sulfur globules outside of their cells. The cells are rod-shaped, vibrioid, or spirilla, and they are able to move using flagella. In general, they are marine and prefer anaerobic conditions. Ectothiorhodospiraceae are a vibrio bacteria that require salty living conditions to survive and grow: classifying them as slightly halophilic. Like all purple sulfur bacteria, they are capable of photosynthesis. To complete this energy process, Sulfur compounds are used as electron donors for carbon fixation in the pentose phosphate pathway. This elemental sulfur accumulates outside of the cells.

Ectothiorhodospiraceae mobilis Table of Characteristics

Note: + = positive, - = negative

References

External links
 J.P. Euzéby: List of Prokaryotic names with Standing in Nomenclature - Ectothiorhodospiraceae

Chromatiales